Francis Mathew, 1st Earl Landaff (September 1738 – 30 July 1806) was an Anglo-Irish politician and peer.

Mathew was the only son and heir of Thomas and Mary Mathew. His father's family had settled in Ireland from Wales a generation before. He had one sister, Catherine, who married firstly Philip Roe, and secondly John Scott, 1st Earl of Clonmell. She died in 1771. Mathew served in the Irish House of Commons as the Member of Parliament for Tipperary between 1768 and 1783. In 1769 he was High Sheriff of Tipperary. On 12 October 1783 he was raised to the Peerage of Ireland as Baron Landaff, of Thomastown in the County of Tipperary, and assumed his seat in the Irish House of Lords. On 4 December 1793 he was further honoured when he was made Viscount Landaff.

From 1794 to 1797, Lord Landaff was Colonel of the 14th Regiment of Foot. On 22 November 1797 he was made Earl Landaff. Following the implementation of the Acts of Union 1800, he was elected as one of the 28 original Irish representative peers and took his seat in the British House of Lords. Between 1769 and his death he also held the position of Custos Rotulorum of Tipperary.

Lord Landaff married three times. He was succeeded in his titles by his eldest son from his first marriage, Francis Mathew. Another son was the politician, Montague James Mathew.

Francis married first 6 September 1764 to Ellis Smyth, daughter of James Smyth Esq. of Tinny Park, of Co. Wicklow. She died in 1781.

Children included:
 Francis James Mathew (1768-1833) marriage childless with Gertrude Cecilia La Touche.
 Montague James Mathew (1773-1819) died unmarried.

Francis married secondly in June 1784 to Catherine Skeffington, daughter of Clotworthy Skeffington, 1st Earl of Massereene. She died in 1796.

Children included:
 George Toby Skeffington Mathew, died unmarried in 1832.
 Elizabeth Skeffington Mathew, survived all her brothers and died unmarried in 1842, bequeathing the property to her cousin the Comte de Jarnac and Vicomte de Chabot (1780-1875), whose mother was Elizabeth Smyth, sister of Ellis, Countess of Llandaff.

Francis's third and final marriage was to the younger daughter of Jeremiah Coghlan of Co. Waterford. The marriage was childless.

References

|-

|-

1738 births
1806 deaths
1
Francis
Peers of Ireland created by George III
High Sheriffs of Tipperary
Irish MPs 1769–1776
Irish MPs 1776–1783
Members of the Irish House of Lords
Irish representative peers
West Yorkshire Regiment officers
Members of the Parliament of Ireland (pre-1801) for County Tipperary constituencies